Hendricks County is a county in the U.S. state of Indiana. As of the 2010 United States Census, the population was 145,448. The county seat is the town of Danville.

Hendricks County is the third largest county in the Indianapolis-Carmel-Anderson, IN Metropolitan Statistical Area. Hendricks County is currently the second fastest-growing county in Indiana and 85th in the nation.

History
After the American Revolutionary War established US sovereignty over the territory of the upper midwest, the new federal government defined the Northwest Territory in 1787 which included the area of present-day Indiana. In 1800, Congress separated Ohio from the Northwest Territory, designating the rest of the land as the Indiana Territory. President Thomas Jefferson chose William Henry Harrison as the governor of the territory, and Vincennes was established as the future capital. After the Michigan Territory was separated and the Illinois Territory was formed, Indiana was reduced to its current size and geography. By December 1816 the Indiana Territory was admitted to the Union as a state, although much of its territory was still in dispute as to possession by Native Americans. The land containing Hendricks County was brought into the possession of the United States by the Treaty of St. Mary's in 1818 (known as New Purchase).

The eighth General Assembly of the new state of Indiana met at its then-capital town, Corydon, in December 1823, and created three counties before the close of the session, among them being Hendricks, the state's fifty-first county. The bill creating Hendricks County was introduced in the Senate on 9 December and was signed on 20 December by Indiana Governor William Hendricks, in whose honor the new county was named. Until its governing structure was organized, the territory was assigned to neighboring counties for legislative and enforcement matters.

Prior to the New Purchase treaty, the territory of Hendricks County had been occupied by the Dakota tribe, although there were no significant native villages within its future borders. The treaty authorized the territory to be surveyed by the federal government, with land being available for settlement thereafter. This survey work began in the Hendricks County area in 1819, and settlers began moving in as soon thereafter (the first in future Hendricks County in Spring 1820) as land filing was authorized, such that by 1823 there were sufficient inhabitants to justify forming a county. Designated commissioners met in July 1824, and on 12 July selected Danville as its county seat. The town plat was filed for record in October 1824; a court house was erected and in operation there by 1826.

Geography
The county's low rolling hills are entirely devoted to agriculture or urban development, except for wooded drainages. The West Fork of White Lick Creek flows southeastward through the western part of the county and the East Fork flows southward through the east part of the county; the two flows converge at the south county line. The highest point on the terrain ( ASL) is a small rise  WNW from Danville.

Adjacent counties

 Boone County - north
 Marion County - east
 Morgan County - south
 Putnam County - west
 Montgomery County - northwest

Towns

 Amo
 Avon
 Brownsburg
 Clayton
 Coatesville
 Danville - county seat
 Lizton
 North Salem
 Pittsboro
 Plainfield
 Stilesville

Unincorporated communities

 Belleville
 Camby - part
 Cartersburg
 Clermont Heights
 Friendswood
 Gale
 Hadley
 Hazelwood
 Joppa
 Maplewood
 Montclair
 New Winchester
 Pecksburg
 Raintown
 Reno
 Six Points
 Springtown
 Summit
 Tilden
 Center Valley

Townships

 Brown
 Center
 Clay
 Eel River
 Franklin
 Guilford
 Liberty
 Lincoln
 Marion
 Middle
 Union
 Washington

Climate

Transportation

Airport
 2R2 - Hendricks County Airport

Major highways

Demographics

2010 census
As of the 2010 United States Census, there were 145,448 people, 52,368 households, and 39,698 families in the county. The racial makeup of the county was 90.1% white, 4.9% black or African American, 2.1% Asian, 0.2% American Indian, 1.1% from other races, and 1.6% from two or more races. Those of Hispanic or Latino origin made up 3.0% of the population. In terms of ancestry, 28.3% were German, 16.2% were English, 15.2% were Irish, and 9.4% were American.

Of the 52,368 households, 40.3% had children under the age of 18 living with them, 61.9% were married couples living together, 9.8% had a female householder with no husband present, 24.2% were non-families, and 19.8% of all households were made up of individuals. The average household size was 2.71 and the average family size was 3.12. The median age was 36.7 years.

The median income for a household in the county was $47,697 and the median income for a family was $77,397. Males had a median income of $54,945 versus $38,919 for females. The per capita income for the county was $28,880. About 4.3% of families and 5.7% of the population were below the poverty line, including 7.3% of those under age 18 and 5.3% of those age 65 or over.

Government

The county government is a constitutional body, and is granted specific powers by the Constitution of Indiana, and by the Indiana Code.

County Council: The legislative branch of the county government; controls spending and revenue collection in the county. Representatives are elected to four-year terms from county districts. They set salaries, the annual budget, and special spending. The council has limited authority to impose local taxes, in the form of an income and property tax that is subject to state level approval, excise taxes, and service taxes.

Board of Commissioners: The executive body of the county; commissioners are elected county-wide to staggered four-year terms. One commissioner serves as president. The commissioners execute acts legislated by the council, collect revenue, and manage the county government.

Courts: The county has six trial courts consisting of a circuit court and five superior courts, the judges of which are elected to 6-year terms in a countywide election. In addition, two magistrates appointed by the elected judges serve the county as judicial officers. There are currently three town courts that also operate in Hendricks County, one each in Avon, Brownsburg, and Plainfield.

County Officials: The county has other elected offices, including sheriff, coroner, auditor, treasurer, recorder, surveyor, and circuit court clerk. These officers are elected to four-year terms. Members elected to county government positions are required to declare party affiliations and to be residents of the county.

Hendricks County is part of Indiana's 4th congressional district; Indiana Senate districts 23 and 24; and Indiana House of Representatives districts 28, 40, 47, and 91.

See also
 National Register of Historic Places listings in Hendricks County, Indiana

References

Further reading
 Balough, Linda and Betty Bartley. A Pictorial History of Hendricks County, Indiana. Marceline: Walsworth Publishing Company (1999). 
 Hadley, John Vestal. History of Hendricks County, Indiana, her people, industries and institutions. Charleston: Nabo Press (2010).

External links

 Hendricks County Government
 Hendricks County Economic Development Partnership
 Hendricks County Convention and Visitors Bureau 
 Leadership Hendricks County
 City-Data.com Comprehensive Statistical Data and more about Hendricks County

 
Indiana counties
1824 establishments in Indiana
Populated places established in 1824
Indianapolis metropolitan area